Extracutaneous mastocytoma presents with benign appearing mast cells occurring in sites other than the skin or bone marrow.

See also
Mastocytosis
Skin lesion

References

External links 

Immune system disorders